Neoclanis is a genus of moths in the family Sphingidae, containing one species, Neoclanis basalis, which is known from dry bush and woodland from Zimbabwe and Angola to Zambia, Tanzania and eastern Kenya.

References

Smerinthini
Monotypic moth genera
Moths of Africa
Taxa named by Robert Herbert Carcasson